The House of Tears is a lost 1915 silent film drama directed by Edwin Carewe and starring Emily Stevens who plays two roles. It was produced by B. A. Rolfe and distributed through Metro Pictures.

Cast
Emily Stevens - Mrs. Alice Collingwood / Gail Collingwood
Henri Bergman - Robert Collingwood (*not Henry Bergman)
Walter Hitchcock - Henry Thorne
George Brennan - John
Madge Tyrone - Nurse
Bernard Randall - unknown role

References

External links

1915 films
American silent feature films
Films directed by Edwin Carewe
Lost American films
American black-and-white films
Silent American drama films
1915 drama films
Metro Pictures films
1915 lost films
Lost drama films
1910s American films